Goolma is a tiny village community in the Central West of New South Wales, Australia. It is located on the Dubbo road, which links the towns of Mudgee, Gulgong and Wellington. At the 2021 census, the Goolma region had a population of 95 people.

Inside the village, there are a few tennis courts, a roadhouse, a used car dealership, Anglican and Roman Catholic churches and the Goolma Hotel. Most of the surrounding area of Goolma is agricultural, with farmers producing cereals, wool, cattle and lambs.

Near Goolma was the Belara Copper Mine, which operated from 1880 to at least 1908. 

Goolma was intended to be served by a cross-country railway line running from Sandy Hollow to Mary Vale, but work was stopped in 1950 and the line was never completed. An abandoned tunnel and unfinished bridges and embankments are landmarks to the abandoned line.

The small Goolma Public School which was founded in 1875 is very competitive in the regional sports carnivals.

Goolma had a rugby union team up until the 1990s called the "Polar Bears", but with most of the village either moving or aging, the team eventually atrophied and is no longer competing.

The Goolma Cricket Club has had a team since 1906 and currently competes in the Gulgong area.

The Tennis club holds a weekly night competition during the summer months and holds monthly tournaments for the rest of the year.

Nine Network presenter, Tim Sheridan was raised outside Goolma, with his older brothers playing for the Polar Bears.

Also, former Sydney Roosters forward Daniel Conn was raised near Goolma. After receiving a sports scholarship to The King's School, Parramatta, Conn was contracted by the Canterbury Bulldogs until he was offered a new contract with the Gold Coast Titans. He finished his NRL playing career at the Sydney Roosters.

References

External links

Goolma Public School web site

Towns in New South Wales
Towns in the Central West (New South Wales)
Mining towns in New South Wales